Deep sea drilling may refer to:
 Deep Sea Drilling Project
 Offshore drilling
 Deepwater drilling